Amirabad (also Romanized as Amīrābād) is a village in Rigestan Rural District, Zavareh District, Zavare County, Isfahan Province, Iran. At the 2006 census, its population was 51, in 20 families.

References 

Populated places in Ardestan County